Elegies is a song cycle by William Finn about the deaths of friends and family and is a response to the September 11, 2001 terrorist attacks. Elegies premiered at Lincoln Center in 2003 and has been performed in many other venues.

Productions
The song cycle premiered at Lincoln Center, the Newhouse Theater (New York City), running from March 2, 2003 to April 19, 2003. Directed by Graciela Daniele, the cast starred Christian Borle, Betty Buckley, Carolee Carmello, Keith Byron Kirk, and Michael Rupert. The production was recorded nearly complete and released on compact disc by Fynsworth Alley (distributed through Varèse Sarabande).

Themes
Most of the songs were composed in memory of Finn's friends, several of whom died of AIDS. Three songs deal specifically with the passing of his mother, Barbara Finn. The final set of songs deal with the collapse of the World Trade Center and its emotional aftermath. In a review of a regional production in 2004, the reviewer wrote: "Never morbid, Elegies is touching, funny, and ultimately buoyant; floating on the spirits of those who inhabit its songs. Consisting of eighteen diverse musical moments, the styles and tones range throughout the musical from the unabashedly optimistic -- "Life has infinite, infinite joys!" -- to the hilariously irreverent."

Musical numbers

Looking Up Quintet  
Mister Choi & Madame G 
Mark's All-Male Thanksgiving 
Only One 
Joe Papp 
Peggy Hewitt & Mysty del Giorno 
Passover
Infinite Joy 
The Ballad of Jack Eric Williams (and other 3-named composers) 
Fred † 
Elevator Transition † 
Dear Reader † 
Monica & Mark 
Anytime (I Am There) 
My Dogs 
Venice 
14 Dwight Ave., Natick, Massachusetts 
When the Earth Stopped Turning 
Goodbye 
Boom Boom 
Looking Up 
Goodbye (Finale)
† Not featured on Original Off- Broadway Cast Recording

Main characters represented
 Mark Thalen, attorney and gay-rights advocate
 Bill Sherwood, director/editor/screenwriter of the film Parting Glances
 Joseph Papp, producer and impresario 
 Peggy Hewitt, character actress 
 Misty del Giorno, chiropractor
 Jack Eric Williams, composer and performer 
 Ricky Ian Gordon, composer
 Quentin Crisp, raconteur/actor/writer 
 Monica Andress, a friend of the composer
 Bolek Greczynski, art therapist, creator the Living Museum at Creedmoor
 Barbara Finn, the composer's mother

Notable productions

UK Premiere
 Arts Theatre Off-West End, directed by Jamie Lloyd - 7–14 November 2004

The cast included
John Barrowman
Peter Caulfield
Ray Shell
Susannah Fellows
Lauren Ward

 Boston Premiere by SpeakEasy Stage Company at the Boston Center for the Arts, Boston, Massachusetts - May 7–29, 2004

Cast:
Kerry Dowling 
Michael Mendiola 
Jose Delgado
Will McGarrahan 
Leigh Barrett

Directed by Paul Daigneault,
Musical Direction by Paul S. Katz,
Production Stage Management by Dana Elizabeth Wolf,

 Toronto Premiere by Acting Up Stage Theatre Company at the Berkeley Street Theatre, Toronto, Ontario - February 15 - March 4, 2007

Cast:
Thom Allison 
Barbara Barsky 
Steven Gallagher 
Eliza-Jane Scott 
Michael Strathmore

Directed by Lezlie Wade,
Musical Direction by Wayne Gwillim,
Produced by Mitchell Marcus,
Stage Managed by Dot Routledge.

 New York City Benefit Production, August 16, 2010

Cast:
Michael Brian Dunn 
Darius de Haas 
Jason Forbach 
AnnMarie Milazzo 
Kerry O'Malley

Directed by Michael Rader,
Musical Direction by Eddie Guttman,
Produced by Jamie McGonnigal,
Stage Managed by David Beris.

Notes

References
Elegies information at Falsettos.net William Finn Official site
Showbusiness Weekly review

External links
TalkinBroadway review

Song cycles
Musicals by William Finn
Music about the September 11 attacks
2003 musicals